Croatian Pre-Romanesque art and architecture or Old Croatian Art is Pre-Romanesque art and architecture of Croats from their arrival at Balkans till the end of the 11th century when begins the dominance of Romanesque style in art; that was the time of Croatian rulers (Croatian dukes and Croatian Kingdom).

Historical background

The Croats moved from northern Europe, together with other Slavs and Avars, to the area of former Roman provinces of Pannonia, Dalmatia and Istria, where they live up to the present day. There they founded several principalities: Pannonian Croatia in the north around the river Sava, and Dalmatian Croatia along the western and southern Adriatic coast. Together they were known as White Croatia, while to the east there were medieval principalities in southern Dalmatia which were at times collectively called Red Croatia.

The Croats were an Iron Age nomadic culture, and tended to avoid the Roman cities, instead moving to the countryside nearby (for example the river island on the delta of the river Jadro beside the city of Salona). The Croats had assimilated the Avars, accepted Christianity, and the ruling caste had learned to speak and write Latin. Croats had accepted Christianity from Franks to the west and from Byzantium from the east. Most of the principalities turned to Christianity in the 9th century except Pagania which remained true to old Slav mythology until the 13th century.

First Croatian ruler that was recognized by the pope was duke Branimir, who was called by pope John VIII dux Chroatorum in his letter in 879.
First king of Kingdom of Croatia, Tomislav from the House of Trpimirović was crowned around year 925 as rex Chroatorum and he united Pannonian Principality and Littoral Croatian Duchy into respectable medieval country  which peaked during the reign of Petar Krešimir IV (1058-1074).

During the time of Croatian rulers the country was rarely ruled from one place and royal court would move from town to town in which there was a royal castle. The most important royal cities were Nin, Biograd na Moru and Knin. Other bigger cities were Zadar, Split, Krk, Osor, Trogir, Ston and Dubrovnik, in which big number of original Roman population resided that was eventually croaticized.

After the death of last ruler from the dynasty of Trpimirović in 1091 most of Croatian nobility has accepted the Hungarian king Coloman as a king of unified kingdom of Croatian and Hungary, stated by the deal Pacta Conventa from year 1102. In Hungarian Kingdom, in Croatia all art already has all characteristics of Romanesque style.

Architecture

During the 7th and 8th centuries there was a trend of constructing smaller buildings from the material and decorative elements of ruined older Roman buildings. During the 9th century, parallel with the establishment of Croatian principalities, new architecture of pre-Romanesque characteristics emerged. It was based on numerous influences of which the Frankish and Byzantine were the strongest. Slowly these inherited influences evolved into a more original style of architectural forms.

From this time, there are dozens of large churches, and over a hundred small ones preserved across the Croatian coastline and islands. They are all built out of roughly broken stones covered with thick layer of moulter inside and out, and with narrow decorative niches with arched top (like church of st. Peter in Priko near Omiš and St. Michael near Ston). Also, they often have stone vaults, apses and domes, as well as stone furniture (frames of doors and windows, perforated stone windows, and altar fences) columns, beams and portals. Instead of classical Roman forms where every part of the building was articulated and had its own recognizable form, new pre-Romanesque buildings have those parts united in unified mass. Therefore, the point where the wall turns to vault, or to drum of the dome is almost unnoticeable. Even though they were built roughly with unsophisticated materials they have excellent and often perfect understanding of architectural space.

Smaller churches are called “churches of free shapes” as which the medieval architects wanted to explore all possibilities of shaping on the circular and rectangular base. Cube churches with dome are a bit simple (St. Pelegrin, Dugi otok), rectangular with elliptical base are a bit more complex (St. George, Ravanjska), as well as single nave churches with dome above middle section (St. Peter in Omiš) and cube based churches elongated with two apses (Church of St. Donatus on Krk) and the most complicated ones are those based on Greek cross with dome on the centre and large apse in eastern wing and two smaller apses in northern and southern wing (Church of Saint Cross in Nin).

The most original churches are churches based on a circle with multiple apses that are spread around in radial rhythm. Church of Holy Trinity, Split has radial 6 apses, while Church in Ošlje (Ston) is the ony one with 8 apses. The biggest church with circular base is Church of St. Donatus in Zadar from the 9th century. Around its circular base that has a dome there is a ring nave with gallery and three apses on the east. From that time in central Europe there is only Charlemagne's Palatine Chapel in Aachen that can be compared with its size and beauty.

Large churches often have one or three naves, like St. Saviour, Cetina from the 9th century which has rounded buttresses and a bell tower above the western portal (westwork).

In the 10th century Croatian queen Jelena of Zadar, the wife of king Mihajlo Krešimir II, built in Solin two churches: Church of St. Stephen of the Island which was used as a royal mausoleum, and Church of Our Lady of the Island, one of the biggest in Croatia which was used as crown basilica. Church of St. Stephen was built in Carolingian style with entrance hall above which was a gallery surrounded with two towers (westwork) from each sides of a narthex which led to tree nave church with two rows of pillars and a square apse at the end of central nave.

In the 11th century, next to older “Church on the Hill” in Solin, Crown church of St. Peter and Moses (better known as “Hollow church“) was built. The church was of unified Croatian pre-Romanesque forms and those Romanesque that appeared with the arrival of Benedictine monks in these parts. It has three naves, many thin niches inside and three apses of which middle is square and other are semicircular from inside and square outside. In this church the legate of Pope Gregory VII has crowned Croatian Dmitar Zvonimir.

In northern Croatia there are only few fragments of interlace found in Sisak, the capital of Ljudevit Posavski. When the bishopric was founded in Zagreb (1090), Croatian culture at the coast has already flourished for 300 years and Croatia was at the end of its independence.

Sculpture

Pre-Romanesque Croatian churches are also the most important historical sources of that time because on their beams and tympanums of altar fences, as well on some portals and ciboriums we found many names of Croatian kings, dukes and nobleman which are mentioned as patrons and builders of those churches. The oldest one is from church in Rižinice (Solin) which mentions Croatian duke Trpimir (PRO DVCE TREPIMERO), from around year 850, while on the inscription of duke Branimir from year 888 we have the oldest mention of Croats: CRVATORVM. On the rest from 10th century we found the names of dukes Muncimir of Croatia, Držislav and Svetislav, all the way to king Zvonimir from the end of the 11th century.
That inscription of king Zvonimir is already made in Croatian, written in Glagolitic script (Baška tablet).

Double literacy and two scripts have been noticed in several monuments as Plomin tablet (Istria) and Valun tablet (Cres, 11th century) where we have Latin and script as well as Croatian translation in Glagolitic script. Nevertheless, soon the Latin script replaced the Glagolitic which was the only way that Croats would be accepted into still Romanized Medieval Europe. However, Croats will use their native language and script all the way to the 16th century, especially in Istria, Kvarner and on the Croatian coast.

Altar fences and stone perforated windows were decorated with shallow interlace ornament which we call Croatian interlace. Motifs of this interlace are often of classical origin (waves, three string interlace, pentagrams, nets of rhomboids, etc.), but while in the Roman art it was used only as a frame, here they cover the entire surface. Sheer number, but also the quality of stonework, of these monuments tells us of rich masonry tradition of numerous masters and workshops on the east coast of Adriatic. Comparing to thousands of fragments found in Dalmatia, in the northern Croatia there are only two confirmed founds: one in Lobor and one in Ilok.

Sometimes the interlace is replaced with figures of Gospels (like on the altar fence of Holy Sunday Church in Zadar), but those figures are flatten and their character lines are reduced to graphic lines in outmost linear stylization. The same is the relief from Crown Hollow church of king Zvonimir in Solin with the figure of (Croatian) king on the throne with Frankish crown, beside him is a page, and on the ground is a bowing subject. This relief is from the 15th century a front part of a baptistery in Split Cathedral.

In church of St. Mary from the 11th century in Bishopric (Biskupija) near Knin the oldest figure of Holy Mary in Croatia was found.

Painting

Croatian interlace was originally painted, usually every string would be coloured brightly yellow, red or blue. Since the wall paintings that are mentioned in several literal sources (like the portraits of Trpimirović dynasty in church of St. George in Putalj above Kaštel Sućurac) are not preserved, they are only type of pre-Romanesque Croatian painting.

Significant number of church codices were preserved. They were done on pergam with pre-Romanesque miniatures of high quality and technique. The oldest one is Split Breviary that was written and painted from the 8th to 11th centuries, based on famous Breviaries from pre-Carolingian era. In Zagreb there is a Liber psalmorum which was illuminated in Benedictine style by prior Majon for archbishop Paul of Split (c. 1015–1030). In Vatican there is a Breviary, also in monte-cassino Benedictine style (initials of intertwined leaves, interlace and animal heads) which originates from monastery of St. Nicola in Osor. The same style of illumination we can found in Breviars in Trogir, Šibenik and Dubrovnik but there are many that were recorded (like 47 books in only one church in monastery of St. Peter in Seka) but not preserved.

See also
 Pre-Romanesque art and architecture

Sources

 Josef Strzygowski, About development of Old Croatian Art, Zagreb, Matica hrvatska, 1927. (hr.)
 Old Croatian Heritage, Grafički zavod Hrvatske, Zagreb, 1976. (hr.)
 Mladen Pejaković, Old Croatian Sacral architecture, Nakladni zavod Matice hrvatske, Kršćanska sadašnjost (Zagreb), 1982. (hr.)

External links
 Photographs

Croatian art
Western art
Medieval art
Medieval architecture
Architectural history
Architecture in Croatia
Medieval Croatia